This is a list of notable people from Galway, city in the West of Ireland, in the province of  Connacht.

List
Thomas Arthur, comte de Lally, Baron de Tollendal (1702-1766)
Margaret Athy, founder of St. Augustine's Convent, Galway
Nora Barnacle, wife of James Joyce
Francis Barrett, professional boxer
Joseph Henry Blake (1797–1849), 3rd Baron Wallscourt
Brian Brosnan, retired national boxing champion
Ken Bruen, author
Áine Brady
Sister Mary Bonaventure Browne, Poor Clares nun and historian
Peadar de Burca, actor, playwright, comedian
Robert Malachy Burke, Christian Socialist development worker
Ulick Burke
Ciarán Cannon
Eamon Casey, ex-Roman Catholic bishop
J. J. Clancy, MP
Catherine Connolly
Paul Connaughton Snr
Paul Connaughton Jnr
Nicola Coughlan, actress
Anthony Daly (Whiteboy) (ex.1820)
Patrick D'Arcy, lawyer and Confederate Ireland leader
Patrick Deeley, poet, memoirist and children's writer 
Richard Donovan, long distance runner
Anthony Duane (1679–1747)
Luke Duffy, trade unionist; Senator 
Jim Fahy, RTÉ reporter
Mickey Finn, fiddler 
David Forde, soccer player
Máire Geoghegan-Quinn
Pat Gibson, a top prize winner on Who Wants to Be a Millionaire?
Eamon Gilmore
Julian Gough, writer and former lead singer of Toasted Heretic
Lady Gregory (1852–1932)
Noel Grealish
James Hardiman
Frank Harris
Michael D. Higgins, politician
Rita Ann Higgins (born 1955)
Dolores Keane, musician
Cáit Keane
Colm Keaveney
Richard Kirwan
Tom Kitt
Michael P. Kitt
Seán Kyne
Gerard Lally (fl. 1689–1737)
Graham Lee, jockey
Tony Lundon (born 1979), pop singer
Angela Lynch
Patrick Lynch, Roman Catholic bishop of Charleston, South Carolina
Patrick Lynch, Irish emigrant to Argentina; ancestor of Che Guevara
Peirce Lynch (fl. 1485)
Walter Macken (1915–1967)
Richard Martin fitz Oliver (1602–1648), father of Richard Martin ("Humanity Dick")
Violet Florence Martin (1862–1915)
Edward Martyn (1859–1923)
Gerard A. Hays McCoy (1911–1975)
Pádraic McCormack
Pat McDonagh
Bishop James McLoughlin
Pauline McLynn, actress
Mary Mitchell O'Connor
Aoife Mulholland, musical actress
Rónán Mullen, columnist with the Irish Daily Mail
Brendan Murray, musician
Hildegarde Naughton
Derek Nolan
Nora-Jane Noone, actress
Brendan O'Brien, cricketer
Pádraic Ó Conaire, Irish language author
Éamon Ó Cuív, Fianna Fáil politician
Liam O'Flaherty
Dessie O'Halloran
William O'Halloran, trade union pioneer
Gideon Ouseley
Marc Roberts
Anne Rabbitte
John Sealy Townsend (1869–1967), mathematical physicist
Tom Senier, Irish melodeon player
Noel Treacy
Matthew Tullie
Alexander Young
Joe Burke All Ireland accordion champion (1950, 1951)
Bríd Uí Murchú, writer (Arron Connolly) footballer

See also
 List of Irish people
 List of NUI Galway people

 
People